Sergei Vikulov (born 24 July 1957), is former Russian professional ice-hockey player who spent most of his career in Soviet ice-hockey league. Later in his career he also played in DEL and Danish league.

External links
 hockeydb.com
 Eliteprospects.com

1957 births
Living people
Dinamo Riga players
HC Dinamo Minsk players
Russian ice hockey defencemen
People from Chita, Zabaykalsky Krai
Sportspeople from Zabaykalsky Krai